John Theurer Diebold (June 8, 1926 – December 26, 2005). An American businessman who was a pioneer in the field of automation, founding The Diebold Group to advise corporations around the world  as well as governments in the U.S and abroad in the potential of information technology.

Early life
Diebold was born in Weehawken, New Jersey. After graduating from Weehawken High School, he enrolled at Swarthmore College, then during the war attended the United States Merchant Marine Academy and served in the merchant marine, returning to Swarthmore in 1946 to earn a B.S. in Engineering. He then completed an MBA at the Harvard Business School in 1951.

At the Harvard Business School he worked with venture-capital pioneer Georges Doriot and his colleague Curtis Tarr, who advised Diebold's research project on "Making the Automatic Factory a Reality".  Diebold made automation studies the focus of his assignments for a small Chicago-based consulting firm, then in 1954 he returned to Weehawken to found his own consulting company.  By 1960, he numbered more than 30 prominent clients including such notable companies as Bear, Sterns & Company; Boeing Airplane; General Electric, Radio Corporation of America; Westinghouse Electric; and others.

Diebold's first book, Automation: The Advent of the Automatic Factory,  based on his studies at the Harvard Business School, was published by Van Nostrand in 1952. Owing to independent research and ever-persistent curiosity about the whole field of technology, he originated many of the concepts of data processing and utilization that are accepted today in both automation and management. This book was reissued unchanged on its 30th anniversary as a “management classic” by the American Management Association. He is credited with coining the word automation in its present meaning, and had much to do with introducing it to general usage.

Career summary
1952 wrote first book, Automation, originating many concepts basic in today's technology.

1954 founded John Diebold & Associates, consulting in automation and management; later known as The Diebold Group, the international management consulting firm. It was sold to Daimler-Benz in 1991.

1968 founded The Diebold Institute for Public Policy Studies, an operating foundation to apply advanced computer and communications technology to the improvement of the quality of life for a broad segment of the public. In 2005, the year of his death, the Institute led an international cooperative effort to assess the value of information technology in public infrastructures: health care; road transportation; education; communications and public safety.

Business career
John Diebold & Associates soon grew into The Diebold Group, which played a unique and often central role in the development of the information technology industry. John Diebold and his company were responsible for the creation of new products and services as well as in the definition of the IT role in the management of businesses and governments. His original wish to play a role in and to contribute to the development of a few of the formative issues that changes the world in which we live was fulfilled.

Starting at the founding of the firm, in 1954, Diebold found himself in a unique leadership role of teacher and concepts innovator. He recognized at the outset that computers meant much more than mechanization of existing systems. Instead, they would open hitherto undreamed of opportunities to do new things.

Only a few years after the Diebold Group's founding, books were being written about John Diebold, his ideas and his firm.

Central to all of this was the insight that for computers to achieve their potential they had to be viewed as management and strategy tools. The firm's leadership was evident not only in technical innovations but also in the highest level of strategic planning.

Working through and with the senior managements of the largest and best run corporations in the world, John Diebold and his firm had an impact that went far beyond their small professional firm. There was a multiplier effect with widespread dissemination through these organizations, their managements, employees and customers.

From its founding to its sale in 1991, the firm and John Diebold had a continuing role in the creation and dissemination of new ideas, insights and the introduction of new paradigms. An example was the concepts that talent is capital and its consequences were a key to success in the new world that took shape.

From the beginning Diebold contributed to new expectations for the delivery of public services and to what citizens could expect from governments.

The firm provided counsel to over 100 cities, most U.S. states, several foreign governments and major corporations, in the U.S. and abroad.

John Diebold was active in public as well as private pursuits. He was a trustee of the Carnegie Institution of Washington, the Committee for Economic Development, the National Planning Association, a Fellow of the International Academy of Management, a Member, Executive Committee, the Public Agenda Foundation; Chairman, U.S.East Asian History of Science and Vice Chairman of the Academy for Educational Development.

He also served as Vice Chairman to John J. McCloy at the American Council on Germany. He had six honorary degrees, the Legion of Honor from France and was decorated by the governments of Italy, Germany and Jordan. He also received numerous professional awards.

Books
 Automation: The advent of the Automatic Factory, Van Nostrand, 1952
 Making the future work: Unleashing our powers of innovation for the decades ahead, Simon and Schuster, 1984
 Managing Information: The Challenge and the Opportunity, 1985
 
The Papers and Speeches of John Diebold, 1957-1998
 Volume 1. Beyond Automation: Managerial Problems of an Exploding Technology. Foreword: Peter F. Drucker. McGraw Hill, 1964; Republished by PraegerPublishers, 1970 
 Volume 2. Man and the Computer: Technology as an Agent of Social Change, Frederick A. Praeger, 1969
 Volume 3. Business Decisions and Technological Change, Praeger Publisher, 1970
 Volume 4. The Role of Business in Society. Foreword by James L. Hayes, Chairman, American Management Associations. American Management Associations, 1982
 Volume 5. Managing Information: The Challenge and the Opportunity, Foreword by Thornton F. Bradshaw,Chairman, RCA Corporation. American Management Associations, 1985
 Volume 6. Business in the Age of Information. Foreword by Russell Palmer, Dean, The Wharton School. American Management Associations, 1985
 Volume 7. Technology and Public Policy. Meeting Society's 21st Century Needs. Management Science Publishing Co., 1997
 Volume 8. Maintaining Profitability in an Increasingly Complex Environment. Management Science Publishing Co., 1998
 Volume 9. Information Technology in the 21st Century, Management Science Publishing Co., 1998

Editor, World of the Computer, for Random House in 1973

References

Additional references
 Managerial Innovations of John Diebold. An Analysis of Their Content and Dissemination by Mary Stephens-Caldwell Henderson, LeBaron Foundation, 1966
 John Diebold. Breaking the Confines of the Possible by Wilbur Cross. The Future Makers. James H. Heineman, 1965
 Agent of Change. Forty Years of the Diebold Group Edited by Liesa Bing and Ralph E. Weindling. Diebold Institute for Public Policy Studies, 2001
 The John Diebold Lectures by David W. Ewing. Harvard University Press.
 Computer visionary John Diebold dies by Richard Waters. Financial Times. December 28, 2005. Accessed September 29, 2013
 John Diebold on management by Carl Heyel, Prentice Hall, 1972
 Other People’s Business by Howard Klein, Mason/Charter Publishers, 1976. John Diebold and his firm are principal subject in book.
 Starting at the Top by John Mack Carter and Joan Feeney. William Morrow & Co., 1985. John Diebold one of subjects in book.

Archives and records
John Diebold papers at Baker Library Special Collections, Harvard Business School.
The Diebold Group, Client Reports at Charles Babbage Institute, University of Minnesota. Contains nearly 1000 client reports (1954-1990), prepared for the Diebold Group's corporate clients, government, and other public clients. The reports assess whether and how companies can make use of computers, sometimes including specific recommendations for computer purchases based on predictions for automation in a particular industry.

External links

 John Diebold as an author: John Diebold ist Mister Automation

 John Diebold Papers. Baker Library Historical Collections. Harvard Business School.Harvard University Library; OASIS: Online Archival Search Information System. Mss:867 1906-2003 D559
 Swarthmore Friends Historical Library. Collected Papers of Individual Alumni, John T. Diebold Papers. Call number: R66/R003/002
 Carnegie Institution Trustee Emeritus John Diebold dies at age 79. Carnegie Institution for Science.

1926 births
2005 deaths
People from Weehawken, New Jersey
Swarthmore College alumni
Diebold
Harvard Business School alumni
United States Merchant Marine Academy alumni
Weehawken High School alumni